Russell Cook is a hammered dulcimer builder and player from Oklahoma, United States. 

Russell won first place in the 1981 Walnut Valley National Hammered Dulcimer Championship held in Winfield, Kansas. Cook built his first dulcimer in 1979, and has gone on to build hammered dulcimers.  He originally operated under the name Wood 'N Strings.  In 1991, he merged with Mark and Steve Tindle to form Master Works, which is now located in Bennington, Oklahoma.

Discography
 Red Haired Boy, n/a
 Timeless, 1993
 Morning Has Broken, 1988
 Hark!, 1990
 Reminisce, 1991
 Precious Memories, 1992
 Classical Journeys: Going Home, 1994
 White Christmas, 1998
 Love Me Tender, 2000
 Twilight in the Highlands, 2002

References

External links
 Russell Cook's Web Site (archived from the original)
 Master Works
 Wood 'N Strings (archived from the original)

Hammered dulcimer players
American musical instrument makers
People from Bryan County, Oklahoma
Musicians from Oklahoma
Living people
Year of birth missing (living people)